Bestune, previously known as Besturn, is an automotive marque owned by the Chinese automaker FAW Group.

With products based on older Mazda sedans, Besturn targets upper middle-class Chinese consumers. FAW, Besturn's owner, also manufactures the Chinese market version of the car many Besturn products are based on, the Mazda 6, and Besturn models were initially produced in FAW's Mazda factories.

History
The Besturn B70 made its debut in 2006.

The Besturn B50 made its debut in 2009.

Bestune began to sell its vehicles in the Russian market in 2012 with the B50 as the first model sold, which debuted at the 2012 Moscow International Automobile Salon. It had talks to have a joint venture with Avtotor to have the Besturn X80 manufactured in Russia in 2015. The Besturn X80 started manufacture in Russia in April 2017 and FAW mentions that it would sell at least two to three more models by 2018.

At the end of 2018, the manufacturer decided to rename Besturn's English name to Bestune. The Chinese name Benteng remained unchanged.

On December 15, 2022, Bestune announced the release of a new product brand logo.

Models
 Bestune B30
 Bestune B50
 Bestune B70
 Bestune B70S
 Bestune B90
 Bestune X40
 Bestune X80
 Bestune T33
 Bestune T55
 Bestune T77
 Bestune T99
 Bestune E01
 Bestune NAT (E05)

Sales
The 134,500 units sold in 2010 constituted a substantial increase over the 70,000 of the prior year. Brand popularity for Besturn may have dipped between 2011 and 2012.

References

External links
 Official site 
 Official site

FAW Group brands
Mid-size cars
Sedans
Ford CD3 platform
Cars of China
Luxury motor vehicle manufacturers
Vehicle manufacturing companies established in 2006
2006 establishments in China